Herman Adriaan Zaanen (born 15 March 1948) is a retired Dutch coxswain. He competed at the 1972 Summer Olympics in the coxed pairs, together with René Kieft and Bernard Luttikhuizen, but failed to reach the final.

References

1948 births
Living people
Dutch male rowers
Olympic rowers of the Netherlands
Rowers at the 1972 Summer Olympics
Sportspeople from Rotterdam
Coxswains (rowing)